Baseball was contested at the 2006 Central American and Caribbean Games in Cartagena, Colombia.

References
 

2006 Central American and Caribbean Games
2006
2006
Central American and Caribbean Games